The Delépine reaction is the organic synthesis of primary amines (4) by reaction of benzyl or alkyl halides (1) with hexamethylenetetramine (2) followed by acid hydrolysis of the quaternary ammonium salt (3). It is named after the French chemist Stéphane Marcel Delépine (1871–1965).

Advantages of this reaction are selective access to the primary amine without side reactions from easily accessible reactants with short reaction times and relatively mild reaction conditions. Downsides include that the reaction is often performed using chloroform as solvent, which is toxic, and poor atom economy, including the formation of several equivalents of formaldehyde (a known carcinogen) during quaternary ammonium salt formation.

An example is the synthesis of 2-bromoallylamine from 2,3-dibromopropene.

Reaction mechanism
The benzyl halide or alkyl halide 1 reacts with hexamethylenetetramine to a quaternary ammonium salt 3, each time just alkylating one nitrogen atom. By refluxing in concentrated ethanolic hydrochloric acid solution this salt is converted to the primary amine together with formaldehyde (as the acetal with ethanol) and ammonium chloride.

Depending on the hydrolysis conditions and structure, the nitrogen might instead be lost from the carbon where it had bonded in the first step to give a benzylic aldehyde (the Sommelet reaction).

See also
 Gabriel synthesis

References

Substitution reactions
Name reactions